Mesepermenia is a monotypic moth genus in the family Epermeniidae described by Reinhard Gaedike in 2004. Its only species, Mesepermenia malgachica, was described by the same author in the same year. It is found on Madagascar.

References

Moths described in 2004
Epermeniidae
Monotypic moth genera
Moths of Madagascar